Ana Reeves Salinas (born December 22, 1948), best known as Anita Reeves, is a Chilean television, film and theatre actress and occasional theatre director. In 2004 Reeves received the APES (Asociación de Periodistas de Espectáculos) prize for "Best Comedian Actress" owing to her role in the telenovela Versus. In 2008 she received a tribute to her career on the III Festival Nacional e Internacional Teatro La Olla. In 2010, in the Pedro Sienna Awards she received the prize for "Best Supporting Actress Performance" for the film The Maid.

Television

Films

References

External links
 

1948 births
Chilean stage actresses
Chilean film actresses
Chilean telenovela actresses
Chilean theatre directors
Chilean people of English descent
Living people
People from Santiago